There are two Catholic secondary schools named Bishop Kearney High School in the U.S. state of New York:
 Bishop Kearney High School (Irondequoit, New York), near Rochester
 Bishop Kearney High School (New York City), in Brooklyn